Maruping Dibotelo is a Botswana judge that served as the Chief Justice of Botswana from 2010 to 2018. He was born on October 13, 1947 in Thamaga

References

Living people
Year of birth missing (living people)
Botswana judges